Elizabeth Is Missing is a television drama film directed by Aisling Walsh, adapted by Andrea Gibb from the novel of the same name by Emma Healey. It was broadcast on 8 December 2019 on BBC One. It stars Glenda Jackson as Maud, an elderly woman living with dementia who struggles to piece together a double mystery.

It premiered on PBS on 3 January 2021 as part of its Masterpiece anthology series.

Summary

Maud, a grandmother in her 80s living with Alzheimer's disease, relies on sticky notes to get through the day as her memory slowly deteriorates. One day her best friend, another elderly woman named Elizabeth, fails to meet her as promised. Maud begins to believe something sinister has happened to Elizabeth, but her attempts to raise the alarm are dismissed by those around her. She is forced to investigate on her own as her memory flashes back to the mystery of another disappearance: that of her elder sister, Sukey, 70 years earlier.

Ultimately, Maud's daughter Helen learns that Elizabeth is not missing, she is in the hospital having become sick following gardening with Maud. Prompted by Maud, Helen digs in the garden of Maud's home and uncovers the skeletal remains of Sukey. Sukey's body had been buried there by Frank, Sukey's husband, when the neighbourhood was first being constructed 70 years earlier after he had killed her.

Cast
Glenda Jackson as Maud Horsham, a widowed grandmother living with Alzheimer's disease who lives alone
Liv Hill as Young Maud Palmer
Sophie Rundle as Susan "Sukey" Jefford, Maud's sister who went missing seventy years earlier
Helen Behan as Helen, Maud's daughter
Nell Williams as Katy, Helen's daughter and Maud's granddaughter
Mark Stanley as Frank Jefford, Sukey's husband
Neil Pendleton as Douglas, a lodger who stays with Sukey, Maud and their parents
Sam Hazeldine as Tom Horsham, Maud's son who lives in Germany
Maggie Steed as Elizabeth, Maud's friend
John-Paul Hurley as Mr Palmer, Maud and Sukey's father
Michelle Duncan as Mrs Palmer, Maud and Sukey's mother
Linda Hargreaves as Carla, Maud's carer
Tom Urie as a desk sergeant
Anna-Maria Nabirye as Detective Sergeant Grainger
Rachel Mcphail as PC Pam
Stuart McQuarrie as Peter, Elizabeth's son

Background
Elizabeth Is Missing is based on the novel of the same name by Emma Healey, published in 2014. Glenda Jackson, who left acting in 1992 to begin a 23-year career as a Labour Party MP, returned to the stage in 2015. She stated that she was inspired after director Aisling Walsh approached her about the role in New York. "I read the script and the book, and they concern issues I have been banging on about for a decade. We are living in a society where no political party, at least in my country, has addressed the issue of how we provide the money to provide the care that an elderly population needs," Jackson told The New York Times. To prepare for the role, Jackson met with a doctor from Dementia UK, who she said "explained that the anger that many patients with dementia express was frustration."

Production
STV Studios were responsible for Elizabeth Is Missing, which was filmed in July and August 2019 in Scotland. Paisley, Renfrewshire, stood in for an English town in flashbacks to the 1940s.

Reception
Elizabeth Is Missing was well received by critics, who praised the outstanding performance by Glenda Jackson, who returned to television after a 27-year absence. It was given five stars by Lucy Mangan of The Guardian, who wrote that Jackson "is wonderful, in that vanishingly rare way that can come only from next-level talent as razor-sharp as it ever was plus 40 years of honing your technique, whetting both blades on 80 years of life experience." Suzi Feay  of the Financial Times also gave it five stars.

Fiona Sturges of The Independent gave it four out of five stars, writing: "Rarely off the screen, Jackson is remarkable, playing Maud not as a benign and crinkly grandma but a proud woman unmoored and rendered increasingly impatient and volatile.... Dementia eats away not just at memory but identity, agency and empathy. The pain of these losses are sharply drawn here, both in Maud and her family who mourn the mother and grandmother they once knew."

Carol Midgley of The Times also gave Elizabeth Is Missing four out of five stars, praising the format told from Maud's point of view: "[It] was cleverly told so that we didn't know where Elizabeth was, but experienced her 'disappearance' from Maud's perspective; confused and disjointed with little sense of elapsing time."

The Daily Telegraphs Anita Singh, who gave the film five stars, said Jackson "gave one of the performances of her lifetime" and predicted her as a shoo-in for next year's British Academy Television Award for Best Actress: "If you are an actress hoping to win a BAFTA in February, and your name is not Glenda Jackson, I regret to inform you that this is not your year."

Roslyn Sulcas, who interviewed Jackson for The New York Times, commented that the film was "rapturously received" in the United Kingdom, and commented on the rarity of a film not only focused on dementia but starring an elderly woman.

On 31 July 2020, Jackson won the BAFTA TV award in the leading actress category.

Accolades

References

External links 

2019 television films
2019 films
Films about Alzheimer's disease
Films about domestic violence
Films about old age
Films set in 1949
Films set in 2019
Films scored by Dominik Scherrer
Television series by STV Studios
2019 drama films
Films based on British novels
2010s British films
British drama television films